Cliff Carlisle (May 6, 1903 – April 5, 1983) was an American country and blues musician, singer and songwriter. Carlisle was a yodeler and was a pioneer in the use of the Hawaiian steel guitar in country music.  He was a brother of country music star Bill Carlisle.

Biography

Carlisle was born in Taylorsville, Kentucky and began performing locally with cousin Lillian Truax at age 16. Truax's marriage put an end to the group, and Carlisle began playing with Wilber Ball, a guitarist and tenor harmonizer. The two toured frequently around the U.S. playing vaudeville and circus venues in the 1920s.

Carlisle and Ball first played at Louisville, Kentucky radio station WHAS-AM in 1930, which made them local stars, and later that year they recorded for Gennett Records and Champion Records. In 1931, they recorded with Jimmie Rodgers. Toward the end of 1931, Carlisle signed with ARC and was offered performance slots on several radio stations, including WBT-AM in Charlotte, North Carolina, WLS-AM in Chicago  and WLW-AM in Cincinnati, Ohio. Cliff's brother Bill Carlisle became his guitarist after Ball left in 1934. During the 1930s Carlisle, who recorded a large amount of material despite a hiatus from 1934 to 1936, frequently released songs with sexual connotations including barnyard metaphors (which became something of a hallmark).

Carlisle toured with his son, "Sonny Boy Tommy," to occasional consternation from authorities in areas where this contravened local child labor laws. He continued to perform on WMPS-AM in Memphis, Tennessee for several years in the 1940s, but by the 1950s had retired from music.

In the 1960s, The Rooftop Singers covered his tune "Tom Cat Blues"; in its wake, Carlisle and Ball did a few reunion shows together and recorded for Rem Records. On April 2, 1983, Carlisle died at the age of 79 in Lexington, Kentucky.

Legacy
Carlisle's 1933 song "Goin' Down The Road Feelin' Bad" is featured in the 2017 video game Getting Over It with Bennett Foddy.

Discography

Singles

Albums
 1963: A Country Kind Of Songs and Hymns
 1964: Maple On The Hill
 1965: Cliff Carlisle
 1965: Carlisle Family Album - Old Time Great Hymns (The Carlisle Family)
 1965: Cliff Carlisle Vol. 1+2

References

External links
[ Cliff Carlisle] at Allmusic.com
 Cliff Carlisle recordings at the Discography of American Historical Recordings.

1903 births
1983 deaths
American country singer-songwriters
American country guitarists
American male guitarists
Country musicians from Kentucky
People from Taylorsville, Kentucky
Gennett Records artists
Decca Records artists
Yodelers
20th-century American singers
Singer-songwriters from Kentucky
20th-century American guitarists
Guitarists from Kentucky
20th-century American male musicians
American male singer-songwriters